My Favorite Spy is a 1951 comedy film directed by Norman Z. McLeod and starring Bob Hope and Hedy Lamarr.

Plot
US intelligence agents recruit burlesque comic Peanuts White (Hope) to pose as international spy Eric Augustine, whom he resembles, to acquire a million-dollar microfilm in Tangier, Morocco. There, he encounters the irresistible Lily Dalbray (Lamarr), Augustine's one-time "friend," who is now in league with his arch-enemy, Brubaker.

Cast
 Bob Hope as Peanuts White/Eric Augustine
 Hedy Lamarr as Lily Dalbray
 Francis L. Sullivan as Karl Brubaker
 Arnold Moss as Tasso
 John Archer as Henderson
 Luis Van Rooten as Rudolf Hoenig
 Alden 'Stephen' Chase as Donald Bailey (as Stephen Chase)
 Morris Ankrum as Gen. Frazer
 Angela Clarke as Gypsy Fortune Teller
 Iris Adrian as Lola
 Frank Faylen as Newton
 Mike Mazurki as Monkara
 Marc Lawrence as Ben Ali
 Tonio Selwart as Harry Crock
 Ralph Smiley as El Sarif

Production notes
 Production Dates: late Jan-early Apr 1951
 The working title of this film was Passage to Cairo.
 Bob Hope's character, "Peanuts White," was first conceived as a schoolteacher who, while impersonating a recently deceased gangster, is sent to Cairo to obtain information.  The character was later converted into a standup vaudeville comedian who resembles a leading international spy, and is persuaded to impersonate him on a mission to Tangier.
 In the scene in which Peanuts talks on the phone with President Harry S. Truman, Truman's voice is not heard.
 The "world premiere" of the film took place in Bellaire, Ohio, in the living room of Anne Kuchinka. The Ohio housewife won a letter writing contest sponsored by Hope's radio show, in which participants gave reasons why the premiere should be held in their home.
 Prior to the screening, a star-studded parade and radio broadcast were held in Bellaire. According to a November 19, 1951 Time article, Corp. Karl K. Diegert of the Army Hospital at Camp Atterbury, Indiana, persuaded Hope, who was known for his USO shows, to do a second screening at the camp the day after Bellaire's.

See also
My Favorite Blonde (1942) with Bob Hope and Madeleine Carroll
My Favorite Brunette (1947) with Bob Hope and Dorothy Lamour

References

External links
 
 
 
 

1951 films
American spy comedy films
American black-and-white films
Films scored by Victor Young
Films directed by Norman Z. McLeod
Films set in Tangier
Paramount Pictures films
1950s spy comedy films
Films with screenplays by Jack Sher
1951 comedy films
1950s English-language films
1950s American films